Kenneth John Knapczyk (born April 21, 1963) is an American football coach and former player.

References

External links
 Pro-Football-Reference profile

1963 births
Living people
American football wide receivers
Chicago Bears players
Northern Iowa Panthers football players
Saint Anselm Hawks football coaches
People from Mokena, Illinois
People from New Lenox, Illinois
Players of American football from Illinois
National Football League replacement players